Anochetus yerburyi is a species of ant of the subfamily Ponerinae. It can be found in India and Sri Lanka.

References

External links

 at antwiki.org
Animaldiversity.org
Itis.org

Ponerinae
Hymenoptera of Asia
Insects described in 1900